The Shrinking Violet was a band from Sydney, Australia (1987–1990). They recorded with Phantom Records

Members

Marcus Clement: Vocals, Guitar
Julian Knowles: Guitars, Vocals, Keyboards (see Even As We Speak, Big Heavy Stuff)
Barry 'Fuzz' Hayes: Bass, Vocals
Andrew Clement: Drums (See Other Voices)

Discography
7" Vinyl Single (Purple Vinyl): Everything b/w She Said - Phantom Records 1988. Its highest chart position was #3, On the Street Independent Charts, Australia, 1988
12" Vinyl Album (Yellow Vinyl): Mask  - Phantom Records 1989. Its highest chart position was #6, On the Street Independent Charts, Australia, 1989
12" Vinyl Compilation 'Assorted Desecrations and Mutations'  Phantom Records included tracks  'Love to Rule' (cover of The Sunnyboys first EP track), "Take Me Away' (Cover of The Kelpies)
"Never Too Late" - track included on compilation 'Young Blood II' - RooArt Records 1990

References

New South Wales musical groups